The Plumbers and Gasfitters Employees' Union Building (PGEUB) is an office building for the Plumbing Trades Employees Union, located in Melbourne, Victoria. It was commissioned in 1969 with architect Graeme Gunn to design it, in creative collaboration with landscape designer Ellis Stones, and Merchant Builders. Construction was completed in 1971. The design itself was architecturally intended to be up to date.

The Plumbers and Gasfitters Employees' Union
The Plumbers and Gasfitters Employees' Union was formed in 1911 was originally housed in the Trades Hall complex on the corner of Victoria and Lygon Streets, Carlton. However the union had outgrown these premises by the late 1960s, and a commission was issued to Graeme Gunn to design the new building, next door to Trades Hall. In 1993, the union amalgamated with others to become the Communications, Electrical, Electronic, Energy, Information, Postal, Plumbing and Allied Services Union of Australia.

Design and features

The ground floor consists of a car park and space to house mechanical services, and the first and second floors are office spaces including conference rooms and a lobby. The building has been structurally designed so that if or when required, an extra floor can be added. Current access to the upper floors is via stairs, however a lift-well has been constructed in case of the planned extension is eventually built.

The design emphases the raw structure and materiality of the building, which is composed mostly of off-form concrete, with the material left exposed on the outer surfaces of the building and in some interiors spaces also. For the internal finishes, walls, concrete block work, and stud frame sheeted with plywood are painted. A rough-sawn timber stairwell relieves the strictness of the concrete and glass uniformity. The facade is formed of concrete in bold expressionistic forms with dark smoked glazing that intensify the sculptural quality of the construction. The windows on the east facade are deeply recessed to reduce sun exposure and are glazed with tinted glass. The west facade windows provide natural ventilation to the office areas whereas the rest of the building requires mechanical ventilation.

Brutalist architecture

The Plumbers and Gasfitters Employees’ Union Building is regarded as one of the finest examples of Brutalist architecture in Victoria, and has proven to be a seminal essay in the development of the Brutalist vernacular, along with the Harold Holt Memorial Swimming Pool (1969). The design articulated key ethical and aesthetic directives which influenced architecture in Victoria throughout the 1970s, such directives which included:
Unorthodox arrangement of masses and voids
The honest valuation of construction materials and exposure of natural finishes
Transparency of program through the plan
Emphasis on circulation
Due to the cultural and architectural significance, the PGEUB has a State Level of Cultural Heritage, under the category of Trade Union Office, issued by the Australian National Trust.

References

External links
National Trust Listing: Plumbers and Gasfitters Employees' Union Building

Buildings and structures in the City of Melbourne (LGA)
Heritage-listed buildings in Melbourne
1971 establishments in Australia
Buildings and structures completed in 1971
Brutalist architecture in Australia